Steine may refer to:

Places
Steine, Vestland, a village in Kvam municipality, Vestland county, Norway
Steine, a district in Bø municipality in Nordland county, Norway
Steine, Nordland, a village in Vestvågøy municipality, Nordland county, Norway
Steine, Trøndelag, a village in Nærøysund municipality, Trøndelag county, Norway
The Old Steine, a promenade in Brighton, Sussex, England, in the United Kingdom

Other
Sten-Åke "Steine" Lindberg, a Swedish dansband singer